Raymond W. Goldsmith (Dec 23, 1904 – July 12, 1988, Hamden, Connecticut) was an American economist specialising in historical data on national income, saving, financial intermediation, and financial assets and liabilities.

Goldsmith was born in Brussels to a family of Jewish ancestry, and grew up in Frankfurt. After finishing secondary school, he worked in a bank for a year that include the German hyperinflation of 1923. He then studied at the Berlin Handelshochschule and obtained a Ph.D. from the University of Berlin in 1928. From then until he left for the USA in 1934, he was employed by the German statistical office and the Institut fur Finanzwesen, working on studies of the banking and economic systems of Latin America and elsewhere. He was a fellow at the Brookings Institution, 1930–31, and a postdoc at the London School of Economics, 1933-34.

Between 1934 and 1951, he worked in various capacities at the Securities and Exchange Commission and the War Production Board. At the Department of State, he helped devise the Colm-Dodge-Goldsmith plan for the German currency reform of 1946, and the financial implementation of the 1947 Austrian peace agreement. He was a consultant to many foreign countries including India, Japan, and Brazil.

In 1951, Goldsmith was appointed professor at New York University and a staff member at the National Bureau of Economic Research. In 1953 he was elected as a Fellow of the American Statistical Association. He published his magnum opus, A Study of Saving in the United States, in 1955. This work, partly coauthored with Dorothy Brady and Horst Menderhausen, ran to three volumes totalling more than 2000 pages and included many hundreds of tables of time series data. These data were crucial for early empirical tests of the life cycle and the permanent income theories of consumption, as the official national income accounts for the USA begin only in 1929. From 1962 to 1973, he was Professor of Economics at Yale University, remaining an active scholar until the end of his life.

Goldsmith is mainly known as the author of about 15 scholarly books, immensely rich in historical economic and financial data about the USA, other countries, and the ancient world.
 Financial Intermediaries in the American Economy since 1900.
 1962. The national Wealth of the U.S. in the Postwar Period.
 1963 (with Robert Lipsey and Morris Mendelson). Studies in the National Balance Sheet of the U.S. In two volumes.
 1969. Financial Structure and Development.

The books by Goldsmith are a good place to look for American data on national income flows before 1929, stocks of tangible assets before 1925, and on financial assets and liabilities before 1945. His method for estimating Roman GDP from meager ancient evidence provided the basis for subsequent attempts by economic historians such as Angus Maddison, Peter Temin and others.

His wife, Selma Fine Goldsmith, was also a noted economic statistician.

Works 
 (1984) "An Estimate of the Size and Structure of the National Product of the Early Roman Empire," Review of Income and Wealth 30(3): 263–288.
 (April 1, 1985) Comparative National Balance Sheets: A Study of Twenty Countries, 1688-1978 
 (1958) Financial intermediaries in the American economy since 1900 (Studies in capital formation and financing)

References

External links 
William Parker (1989) "In Memoriam, Raymond W. Goldsmith (1904-1988)," Review of Income and Wealth 35: 103-105.
Oral History Interview with Raymond W. Goldsmith. June 25, 1973 by Richard D. Mckenzie. Harry S. Truman Presidential Library and Museum.

1904 births
1988 deaths
20th-century American economists
Fellows of the American Statistical Association
Belgian emigrants to Germany
German emigrants to the United States